Nicole Yvette Lamb-Hale formerly served as Assistant Secretary of Commerce for Manufacturing and Services. She was confirmed by the United States Senate on February 11, 2010. Prior to being confirmed as Assistant Secretary, she served as Deputy General Counsel of the United States Commerce Department. Currently, she is a Senior Vice President of Albright Stonebridge Group.

Lamb-Hale was born in Detroit, Michigan. She received her B.A. with high honors from the University of Michigan in 1988 and her J.D. from Harvard Law School in 1991.

She was a partner at the law firm of Foley & Lardner in Detroit.

She is a life member of Delta Sigma Theta sorority; a member of The Links, Incorporated; and a member of Jack & Jill of America. In addition, Lamb-Hale served as a member of President Barack Obama’s National Finance Committee and was a Co-Chair and Deputy General Counsel of the Michigan Campaign for Change. She was also selected as one of the 50 Black Women Over 50.

References

Michigan lawyers
African-American lawyers
American women lawyers
Obama administration personnel
United States Department of Commerce officials
Michigan Democrats
University of Michigan alumni
Harvard Law School alumni
Living people
Year of birth missing (living people)
21st-century American women